John Cunningham Robertson (10 May 1809 – 8 March 1873) was an English cricketer who was associated with Oxford University Cricket Club and made his first-class debut in 1829. His son was the cricketer James Robertson.

References

1809 births
1873 deaths
English cricketers
English cricketers of 1826 to 1863
Oxford University cricketers
People educated at Winchester College
Alumni of University College, Oxford